The 2021 NCAA Division I Softball season, play of college softball in the United States organized by the National Collegiate Athletic Association (NCAA) at the Division I level, began in February 2021. The season progressed through the regular season, many conference tournaments and championship series, and concluded with the 2021 NCAA Division I softball tournament and 2021 Women's College World Series. The Women's College World Series, consisted of the eight remaining teams in the NCAA Tournament was held in Oklahoma City at USA Softball Hall of Fame Stadium, and ended on June 10, 2021.

Realignment

For 2021 season 
 Four schools began transitions from NCAA Division II to Division I on July 1, 2020.
 Bellarmine joined D-I for softball and all other sports as a new member of the ASUN Conference.
 Dixie State and Tarleton State joined the Western Athletic Conference (WAC).
 UC San Diego, already a de facto D-I member in women's water polo and men's volleyball (which do not have D-II championship events) as an associate member of the Big West Conference, moved the rest of its athletic program to the Big West.
 La Salle dropped softball after this season.
 Cal State Bakersfield moved from the WAC to the Big West.

Future moves 
The following conference moves for the 2022 season were announced:
 Five schools left the Southland Conference. Abilene Christian, Lamar, Sam Houston, and Stephen F. Austin moved to the WAC, and Central Arkansas left for the ASUN.
 The Mid-Eastern Athletic Conference lost three members. Bethune–Cookman and Florida A&M joined the Southwestern Athletic Conference, and North Carolina A&T went to the Big South Conference.
 The Ohio Valley Conference saw Eastern Kentucky and Jacksonville State also join the ASUN.
 The Summit League gained St. Thomas from NCAA Division III's Minnesota Intercollegiate Athletic Conference after the reception of a waiver for a direct transition to D-I.

Season outlook

Conference standings

Conference winners and tournaments
Of the 31 Division I athletic conferences that participated in the 2021 season, all of which sponsor softball, 27 normally end their regular seasons with a single-elimination tournament or a double-elimination tournament. The teams in each conference that win their regular-season title are given the number one seed in each tournament. The Ivy League canceled its softball season due to COVID-19 concerns. Four conferences do not normally hold a postseason tournament: the Big West, Mountain West, Pac-12, and West Coast Conference. Two conferences that normally hold tournaments, the Big Ten and Mid-American Conference, did not do so in 2021. The winners of these tournaments, plus the Big Ten, Big West, MAC, Mountain West, Pac-12, and WCC regular-season champions, received automatic invitations to the 2021 NCAA Division I softball tournament.

Women's College World Series

Season leaders
Batting:
Batting average: .495 – Kayla Kowalik, Kentucky Wildcats
RBIs: 92 – Tiare Jennings, Oklahoma Sooners
Home runs: 34 – Jocelyn Alo, Oklahoma

Pitching:
Wins: 32-5 – Gabbie Plain, Washington Huskies
ERA: 0.92 (20 ER/151.0 IP) – Courtney Coppersmith, UMBC Retrievers
Strikeouts: 349 – Montana Fouts, Alabama Crimson Tide

Records
Freshman class RBIs:
92 – Tiare Jennings, Oklahoma Sooners

Freshman class slugging percentage:
1.000% – Tiare Jennings, Oklahoma Sooners

Team home runs:
161 – Oklahoma Sooners

Team slugging percentage:
.777% – Oklahoma Sooners

Team runs scored:
638 – Oklahoma Sooners

Team total bases:
1,279 – Oklahoma Sooners

Awards
USA Softball Collegiate Player of the Year: Jocelyn Alo, Oklahoma Sooners

Softball America Player of the Year: Jocelyn Alo, Oklahoma Sooners

Collegiate Woman Athlete of the Year Honda Sports Award Softball: Rachel Garcia, UCLA Bruins

Honda Sports Award Softball: Rachel Garcia, UCLA Bruins

NFCA National Player of the Year: Rachel Garcia, UCLA Bruins

NFCA National Pitcher of the Year: Montana Fouts, Alabama Crimson Tide

Softball America Pitcher of the Year: Odicci Alexander, James Madion Dukes

NFCA National Freshman of the Year: Tiare Jennings, Oklahoma Sooners
Softball America Freshman of the Year: Tiare Jennings, Oklahoma Sooners

NFCA Catcher of the Year: Dejah Mulipola, Arizona

NFCA Golden Shoe Award: Jenna Wildeman, Central Arkansas

All America Teams
The following players were members of the All-American Teams.

First Team

Second Team

Third Team

See also
2021 NCAA Division I baseball season

References